Szczyt  is a village in the administrative district of Gmina Oporów, within Kutno County, Łódź Voivodeship in central Poland, approximately  west of Oporów,  east of Kutno, and  north of the regional capital Łódź.

References

Villages in Kutno County